Jonathan L. Tuepker House, also known as the Anna Bocklage House, is a historic home located at Washington, Franklin County, Missouri. It was built about 1911, and is a -story, three bay, brick dwelling with a rear ell on a stone foundation. It has a gable roof and segmental arched door and window openings.  It features a Victorian style front porch.

It was listed on the National Register of Historic Places in 2000.

References

Houses on the National Register of Historic Places in Missouri
Houses completed in 1911
Buildings and structures in Franklin County, Missouri
National Register of Historic Places in Franklin County, Missouri